Tarhan-e Sharqi Rural District is a rural district (dehestan) in Tarhan District, Kuhdasht County, Lorestan Province, Iran. At the 2006 census, its population was 5,531, in 1,068 families.  The rural district has 13 villages.

References 

Rural Districts of Lorestan Province
Kuhdasht County